The white-collared kite (Leptodon forbesi) is an Endangered species of bird in tribe Pernini and subfamily Perninae of family Accipitridae, the diurnal raptors. It is endemic to northeastern Brazil.

Taxonomy and systematics

Until the early 2000s the white-collared kite was considered an aberrant plumage of the grey-headed kite (L. cayanensis) but morphological and other evidence strongly support its treatment as a full species. It is monotypic.

The species' specific epithet commemorates the British zoologist William Alexander Forbes.

Description

Adults usually have a grey head with a white hindneck, but sometimes only the crown is gray and in other individuals the entire head is white. They have black upperparts, white underparts, and a black tail with a whitish tip and a broad ash-white band in the middle (or two white bands with a narrow black one between them). Their scapulars, secondaries, and inner primaries have broad white tips that are typically reduced or lost through wear.

Distribution and habitat

The white-collared kite is found only in parts of four states of northeastern Brazil: eastern Paraíba, eastern Pernambuco, eastern Alagoas, and southern Sergipe. It primarily inhabits the Atlantic forest though it has been spotted over mangroves.

Behavior

Movement

The white-collared kite is mostly sedentary but has been seen flying over sugar cane fields between isolated forest patches.

Feeding

Essentially nothing is known about the white-collared kite's hunting methods or diet. During the one documented observation the bird swooped from a perch, caught prey thought to be an insect, and returned to the same perch.

Breeding

The white-collared kite's breeding biology is almost unknown. Single birds and pairs have been observed making fluttering "butterfly" display flights between October and January, and an active nest was found in April.

Vocalization

The white-collared kite makes a flight call "kua-kua-kua-kua" and "a cat-like 'eeeAAW'" during the display flight.

Status

The IUCN originally assessed the white-collared kite as Critically Endangered but since 2017 has rated it Endangered. It has a very small and fragmented range and its estimated population of between 250 and 1000 mature individuals is believed to be decreasing. Most of its original habitat has been cleared, primarily for agriculture, and small-scale logging continues in some of the remaining fragments. It is known from only about 30 sites, some of which are private preserves. Brazilian authorities consider it Endangered.

References

Further reading

white-collared kite
Birds of the Atlantic Forest
Endangered animals
Endangered biota of South America
white-collared kite
white-collared kite